"Rush" is a song by English band Big Audio Dynamite II from their fifth album, The Globe (1991). A longer version of "Rush", entitled "Change of Atmosphere", had previously appeared on the group's 1990 album Kool-Aid.

The song samples several musical recordings, including the keyboard component of the Who's song "Baba O'Riley", the organ from the introduction to the Deep Purple song "Child in Time", a drum break from Tommy Roe's "Sweet Pea", drums and guitars from a break in Pigmeat Markham's "Here Comes the Judge", a line from the Sugarhill Gang's song "Rapper's Delight" where Big Bank Hank raps "a time to cry, a time to laugh", and a vocal sample from "You Keep Me Swingin'", from Peter Sellers' Songs for Swingin' Sellers. The shorter 7-inch version omits all the samples except for the "Baba O'Riley" keyboard and the "Sweet Pea" drums.

"Rush" was a number-one hit on the US Billboard Modern Rock Tracks chart for four weeks in 1991, becoming the chart's most successful hit of 1991, and it also topped the Australian and New Zealand singles charts. In the United Kingdom, "Rush" was originally released as the B-side to the 1991 re-release of the Clash's "Should I Stay or Should I Go". The A-side was immensely popular due to its inclusion in a Levi Strauss & Co. advert, causing it to climb to number one on the UK Singles Chart. The sleeve art for the 7-inch and CD singles displayed the Clash on the front, and BAD II on the rear. The record label displays "Should I Stay or Should I Go" as side "A" and "Rush" as side "AA", making it effectively a double A-side release.

Track listings

UK 7-inch and cassette single
 "Rush" (7-inch original version) – 3:11
 "Rush" (New York remix) – 3:55

UK 12-inch single
 "Rush" (New York club mix) – 5:50
 "Rush" (New York instrumental mix) – 5:51
 "Rush" (New York 12-inch mix) – 7:57
 "Rush" (7-inch original version) – 3:11

UK CD single
 "Rush" (7-inch original version) – 3:11
 "Rush" (New York club mix) – 5:50
 "Rush" (New York 12-inch mix) – 7:57
 "City Lights" (full length) – 7:47

US cassette single
 "Rush" (edit)
 "Kool-Aid"

US 12-inch single
A1. "Rushdance" – 8:04
A2. "Rush" (club instrumental) – 9:08
B1. "Rush" (album version) – 4:17
B2. "City Lights" – 7:18

US CD single
 "Rush" (album version) – 4:17
 "Rushdance" – 8:04
 "City Lights" – 7:18
 "Rush" (live) – 5:45

Australian 12-inch, CD, and cassette single
 "Rush"
 "E=MC2"
 "Medicine Show"

Personnel
 Mick Jones – vocals
 Nick Hawkins – guitars
 Gary Stonadge – bass
 Chris Kavanagh – drums
 Andre Shapps – techno, piano, etc.

Charts

Weekly charts

Year-end charts

Certifications

See also
 List of number-one singles in Australia during the 1990s
 List of Billboard Mainstream Rock number-one songs of the 1990s
 List of number-one singles from the 1990s (New Zealand)

References

1991 songs
1991 singles
Big Audio Dynamite songs
Capitol Records singles
Number-one singles in Australia
Number-one singles in New Zealand
Songs written by Mick Jones (The Clash)
Song recordings produced by Mick Jones (The Clash)
UK Singles Chart number-one singles